The Central District of Behabad County is in Yazd province, Iran. At the National Census in 2006, its population (as Behabad District of Bafq County) was 14,577 in 3,564 households. The following census in 2011 counted 11,074 people in 3,134 households. At the latest census in 2016, the district had 13,392 inhabitants in 4,031 households.

References 

Behabad County

Districts of Yazd Province

Populated places in Yazd Province

Populated places in Behabad County